UFC 38: Brawl at the Hall was a mixed martial arts event held by the Ultimate Fighting Championship. It took place at the Royal Albert Hall in London, United Kingdom, on July 13, 2002. The event was seen live on pay-per-view in the United States, and was later released on home video.

History
This was the first UFC event to be held in United Kingdom and the first event to be held outside the United States since UFC 29, which took place in Japan. The card was headlined by a UFC Welterweight Championship bout between champion Matt Hughes and former titleholder Carlos Newton.

Results

See also
 Ultimate Fighting Championship
 List of UFC champions
 List of UFC events
 2002 in UFC

References

External links
 Official UFC Website

Ultimate Fighting Championship events
2002 in mixed martial arts
Mixed martial arts in the United Kingdom
Sport in the City of Westminster
Events at the Royal Albert Hall
2002 sports events in London
July 2002 sports events in the United Kingdom